The Palestine women's national handball team is the national team of Palestine. It is governed by the Palestinian Handball Association and takes part in international handball competitions.

Asian Championship record

References

External links
IHF profile

Women's national handball teams
Handball